The 2010 Indonesian Masters Grand Prix Gold was an international badminton tournament held in Samarinda, East Kalimantan, Indonesia from October 12–17, 2010.

Men's singles

Seeds

Finals

Top half

Section 1

Section 2

Section 3

Section 4

Bottom half

Section 5

Section 6

Section 7

Section 8

Women's singles

Seeds

Finals

Top half

Section 1

Section 2

Bottom half

Section 3

Section 4

Men's doubles

Seeds

Finals

Top half

Section 1

Section 2

Bottom half

Section 3

Section 4

Women's doubles

Seeds

Finals

Top half

Section 1

Section 2

Bottom half

Section 3

Section 4

Mixed doubles

Seeds

  Hendra Aprida Gunawan / Vita Marissa (quarterfinals)
  Fran Kurniawan / Pia Zebadiah Bernadeth (semifinals)
  Muhammad Rijal / Debby Susanto (quarterfinals)
  Ong Jian Guo / Chong Sook Chin (quarterfinals)
  Nova Widianto / Shendy Puspa Irawati (withdrew)
  Tontowi Ahmad / Liliyana Natsir (champion)
  Markis Kido / Lita Nurlita (final)
  Qiu Zihan / Luo Yu (first round)

Finals

Top half

Section 1

Section 2

Bottom half

Section 3

Section 4

References

Indonesian Masters (badminton)
Indonesia
Indonesia Open Grand Prix Gold
Sport in East Kalimantan